CFTX-FM (96.5 MHz) is a commercial Francophone radio station based in Gatineau, Quebec, Canada. The station broadcasts a French sports format branded as BPM Sports. It is owned by RNC Media with radio studios and offices on Jean-Proulx Avenue in Gatineau.

CFTX-FM has an effective radiated power (ERP) of 1,750 watts. The transmitter is on Boulevard St.-Joseph at Rue Bourque, near Quebec Autoroute 5.

History
The station received its approval in 2005.  It signed on the air in 2006.  The first format was Top 40/CHR, calling itself Tag Radio and later, Tag Radio X, after its sister station in Quebec City, CHOI-FM. The 96.5 FM frequency was formerly occupied by a low-power tourist information radio station, CFDT in Ottawa, which began operations in the early 1990s  and was also used in 2002 for a special event radio programming at 96.5 MHz in Gatineau with the callsign CIRC.

Since the station signed on the air in 2006, the station had gone through a number of formats and brandings.

It changed to an alternative rock format as Tag Radio X, in 2009. On July 26, 2010, CFTX flipped to mainstream rock branded as Capitale Rock.

On September 22, 2016, CFTX changed its format to adult hits as Pop 96.5.

On August 12, 2019, CFTX flipped back to Top 40/CHR but retained the "Pop" branding.

In June 2021, the station rebranded as Vibe 96.5; the station shared its branding and airstaff with CHXX-FM in Quebec City. On August 29, 2022, both Vibe stations flipped to sports talk as BPM Sports, networked with Montreal sister station CKLX-FM. Due to CRTC license restrictions requiring at least 50% of their weekly programming to be devoted to music, the stations only carry BPM Sports' weekday and weekend morning lineups, do not carry its play-by-play rights (such as CF Montréal), and otherwise continue to carry music programming.

Transmitters

Former logos

References

External links
bpmsports.ca
Vibe 96.5
 POP Radio
 

Ftx
Ftx
Ftx
Ftx
Radio stations established in 2006
2006 establishments in Quebec